Ab Meshkin (also Romanized as Āb Meshkīn; also known as Āb-e Meshgīn and Āb-i-Mushkin) is a village in Mehraban-e Olya Rural District, Shirin Su District, Kabudarahang County, Hamadan Province, Iran. At the 2006 census, its population was 2,113, in 389 families.

References 

Populated places in Kabudarahang County